Cyathostemon tenuifolius is a member of the family Myrtaceae endemic to Western Australia.

It blooms between September and November producing white flowers.

Often found around swamps, along creek banks, on gentle slopes or on breakaways along the south coast in the Great Southern and Goldfields-Esperance regions of Western Australia where it grows in sandy-loamy or sandy-clay soils over granite or spongolite.

References

tenuifolius
Plants described in 1852
Taxa named by Nikolai Turczaninow